Comito ( died after 528 AD) was a Byzantine stage performer, the daughter of Acacius "the bear-keeper", an elder sister to Theodora and Anastasia. Through Theodora, Comito was a sister-in-law of Justinian I. The Secret History of Procopius is a main source about her. Comito is also mentioned by John Malalas, Theophanes the Confessor and Georgios Kedrenos

Life

Her father, Acacius, was a bear trainer of the hippodrome's Green faction in Constantinople. Her mother, whose name is not recorded, was a dancer and an actress. After her father's death, her mother brought her children wearing garlands into the hippodrome and presented them as suppliants to the crowd. Most of the information from this earliest part of her life comes from the Secret History of Procopius, published posthumously. Critics of Procopius (whose work reveals a man seriously disillusioned with his rulers) have dismissed his work as a severely biased source, vitriolic and pornographic, but have been unable to discredit some of its facts.

Procopius narrates: 
"He [Justinian] took a wife: and in what manner she was born and bred, and, wedded to this man, tore up the Roman Empire by the very roots, I shall now relate. Acacius was the keeper of wild beasts used in the amphitheater in Constantinople; he belonged to the Green faction and was nicknamed the Bearkeeper. This man, during the rule of Anastasius, fell sick and died, leaving three daughters named Comito, Theodora and Anastasia: of whom the eldest was not yet seven years old. His widow took a second husband, who with her undertook to keep up Acacius' family and profession. But Asterius, the dancing master of the Greens, on being bribed by another, removed this office from them and assigned it to the man who gave him the money. For the dancing masters had the power of distributing such positions as they wished." 
Historian James Allan Evans notes that animal acts appeared as entr'actes between chariot races. The post of animal trainer for the various factions often passed from father to son. But Acacius left no son and the second husband of his widow had a weaker claim to the position.

"When this woman saw the populace assembled in the amphitheater, she placed laurel wreaths on her daughters' heads and in their hands, and sent them out to sit on the ground in the attitude of suppliants. The Greens eyed this mute appeal with indifference; but the Blues were moved to bestow on the children an equal office, since their own animal-keeper had just died. When these children reached the age of girlhood, their mother put them on the local stage, for they were fair to look upon; she sent them forth, however, not all at the same time, but as each one seemed to her to have reached a suitable age. Comito, indeed, had already become one of the leading hetaerae [high class prostitutes] of the day." 
Evans notes that Theodora would later favor the Blues as an empress, which could point to them having earned her loyalty through saving her family from the threat of unemployment and poverty. "Theodora, the second sister, dressed in a little tunic with sleeves, like a slave girl, waited on Comito and used to follow her about carrying on her shoulders the bench on which her favored sister was wont to sit at public gatherings.

Marriage

John Malalas records that Comito married general Sittas in 528. The marriage is also recorded by Theophanes and Cedrenus. Sittas and Comito may be the parents of Sophia, who would succeed Theodora as the Byzantine Empress. Sophia is recorded as a niece to Theodora. Whether Anastasia ever married is unknown.

References 

  Baker, G.P.. Justinian: The Last Roman Emperor. Cooper Square Press, 2002 (1-2, 53, 290, 334). Print.
 

6th-century Byzantine people
Justinian dynasty
6th-century Byzantine women
Byzantine courtesans
Medieval actors